Kolkata Uttar Lok Sabha constituency is one of the 543 parliamentary constituencies in India. The constituency is based on the northern parts of Kolkata in West Bengal. All the seven assembly segments of No. 24 Kolkata Uttar Lok Sabha constituency are in Kolkata district. As per order of the Delimitation Commission in respect of the delimitation of constituencies in the West Bengal, Calcutta North West Lok Sabha constituency and Calcutta North East Lok Sabha constituency ceased to exist and a new one came into being: Kolkata Uttar Lok Sabha constituency.

Legislative Assembly Segments

Kolkata Uttar Lok Sabha constituency (parliamentary constituency no. 24) is composed of the following assembly segments:

Members of Parliament

For MPs from northern parts of Kolkata in previous years see Calcutta North East Lok Sabha constituency and Calcutta North West Lok Sabha constituency

Election Results

General election 2019
Source:Source

General election 2014

General election 2009

|-
! style="background-color:#E9E9E9;text-align:left;" width=225 |Party
! style="background-color:#E9E9E9;text-align:right;" |Seats won
! style="background-color:#E9E9E9;text-align:right;" |Seat change
! style="background-color:#E9E9E9;text-align:right;" |Vote percentage
|-
| style="text-align:left;" |Trinamool Congress
| style="text-align:center;" | 19
| style="text-align:center;" | 18
| style="text-align:center;" | 31.8
|-
| style="text-align:left;" |Indian National Congress
| style="text-align:center;" | 6
| style="text-align:center;" | 0
| style="text-align:center;" | 13.45
|-
| style="text-align:left;" |Socialist Unity Centre of India (Communist) 
| style="text-align:center;" | 1
| style="text-align:center;" | 1
| style="text-align:center;" | NA
|-
|-
| style="text-align:left;" |Communist Party of India (Marxist)
| style="text-align:center;" | 9
| style="text-align:center;" | 17
| style="text-align:center;" | 33.1
|-
| style="text-align:left;" |Communist Party of India
| style="text-align:center;" | 2
| style="text-align:center;" | 1
| style="text-align:center;" | 3.6
|-
| style="text-align:left;" |Revolutionary Socialist Party
| style="text-align:center;" | 2
| style="text-align:center;" | 1
| style="text-align:center;" | 3.56
|-
| style="text-align:left;" |Forward bloc
| style="text-align:center;" | 2
| style="text-align:center;" | 1
| style="text-align:center;" | 3.04
|-
| style="text-align:left;" |Bharatiya Janata Party
| style="text-align:center;" | 1
| style="text-align:center;" | 1
| style="text-align:center;" | 6.14
|-
|}

See also
 Kolkata
 List of Constituencies of the Lok Sabha

References

External links
Kolkata Uttar lok sabha  constituency election 2019 result details

Lok Sabha constituencies in West Bengal
Politics of Kolkata district